Kim Lane Scheppele is an American scholar of law and politics. She is the Laurance S. Rockefeller Professor of Sociology and International Affairs in the Princeton School of Public and International Affairs and in the University Center for Human Values at Princeton University. Scheppele joined the Princeton faculty in 2005, after nearly a decade as the John J. O'Brien Professor of Comparative Law and Professor of Sociology at the University of Pennsylvania Law School, where she is still a faculty fellow. Scheppele was at the University of Michigan from 1984 to 1996, and was an Arthur F. Thurnau Professor from 1993 until her departure for Penn.  She received her PhD in sociology from the University of Chicago (1985) and her A.B. in urban studies from Barnard College (1975).

Scheppele is an expert on authoritarian regimes, as well as Hungarian and Poland's politics and law.

Scheppele worked in Hungary in the 1990s, during which she met Viktor Orbán. During the socialist-liberal coalition government of Gyula Horn, she was a researcher at the Constitutional Court and served as an expert advisor to the constitutional drafting committee of the Hungarian Parliament in 1995-1996. She  was the founding Co-Director of the MA Program in Gender and Culture at Central European University, when the program was first accredited.

Now a leading critic of the right-wing Viktor Orbán government, she has called its actions as creating an "unconstitutional constitution", and that Hungarian democracy is in jeopardy. She called Tünde Handó a "judicial Czar" whose role damaged the independence of the Hungarian judiciary. Scheppele also called a proposed constitutional rewrite in 2013 "a toxic waste dump of bad constitutional ideas", which prompted Fidesz MEP György Schöpflin to attack her claims on the basis of political animosity. In the name of the governing Fidesz party, Gergely Gulyás published an open letter to her, claiming that the reasons for her aversion towards the legislation of the Fidesz "are mostly personal and political." She worked together with Hungarian opposition parties to bring down the Orbán government.

In 2013, she testified before the Commission on Security and Cooperation in Europe, repeating her thesis, that Hungary is slanting towards an authoritarian and oligarchic regime.

In December 2017, in an interview in the Hungarian weekly, HVG, Scheppele stated that an opposition cooperation is needed to bring down the Orbán regime in the 2018 Hungarian elections, but the leftist opposition parties are divided, and it is possible that the Fidesz government blackmails some of the socialist politicians. The only party which could put an end to the Orbán regime is the Jobbik, and she expressed her disapproval of the government attacks on this party. In her understanding  "the electoral system has been designed in a way that makes it impossible for the opposition parties to win unless they all unite". She described Viktor Orbán as a charismatic leader "who melts people's brain by focusing his attention on them."

Also a critic of the Trump administration,  Scheppele underlined  that the markers of a falling democracy — "politicizing independent institutions, spreading disinformation, amassing executive power, quashing dissent, and corrupting elections—form a sort of authoritarian playbook, mirroring what scholars have observed in declining democracies around the world, in countries such as Hungary, Poland, Turkey, and Venezuela" (page 29)  could also be found in the actions of president Donald Trump, and tried to "illuminate similarities in the hopes that we can recognize them early enough to prevent the United States from drifting any further down these roads"(page 37).

References

Princeton University faculty
University of Pennsylvania Law School faculty
Living people
American women academics
American women legal scholars
Year of birth missing (living people)
Scholars of comparative law
University of Michigan faculty
21st-century American women
Barnard College alumni
University of Chicago alumni